Johan Nilsson may refer to:

Johan Nilsson (wrestler), Swedish wrestler
Johan Nilsson i Skottlandshus, Swedish politician

See also
Johan Nilsson Guiomar (born 1985), Swedish footballer